Sell Out may refer to:
Selling out, the compromising of principles in exchange for success
Sell Out (Halfcocked album), 1998
$ell Out, a 1999 album by Pist.On
The Who Sell Out, a 1967 album by the Who
"Sell Out" (Reel Big Fish song), 1996
"Sell Out" (Marshmello and Svdden Death song), 2019
Sell Out, a 1996 album by Dia Psalma
Sell Out!, a 2008 Malaysian film

See also
The Sellout (disambiguation)
Selling Out (disambiguation)
Sold Out (disambiguation)